Leymen is a commune in the Haut-Rhin department in Alsace in north-eastern France. The commune is served by Leymen station, on line 10 of the Basel tramway between Rodersdorf and Flüh, and until December 2017 was the only such station to be located on French soil.

See also
 Communes of the Haut-Rhin département

References

Communes of Haut-Rhin